Britto Michael is an Indian film composer, sound engineer, songwriter and singer. He made his debut with the Tamil film, Sundaattam in 2013.

Career
Britto Michael came to Chennai to study, but got interested in scoring music. He has done title tracks for TV shows for Vijay TV, films before landing Sundattam as his first feature film.

Filmography

Released soundtracks

As composer

As singer

As lyricist

References

https://www.filmibeat.com/tamil/movies/koottali.html#story

External links

21st-century Indian composers
Indian film score composers
1986 births
Living people